House Beautiful is an interior decorating magazine that focuses on decorating and the domestic arts. First published in 1896, it is currently published by the Hearst Corporation, who began publishing it in 1934. It is the oldest still-published magazine in what is known as the "shelter magazine" genre.

The magazine was launched in the United Kingdom in the early 1950s, positioned for young 'home-makers.' It is still sold in the UK, where it has a circulation of 93,992.

Editors
 Eugene Klapp and Henry B. Harvey (1896–1897)
 Eugene Klapp (1897–1898)
 Herbert S. Stone (1898–1913)
 Virginia Huntington Robie (1913–1915)
 Mabel Kent (1915–1916)
 Grace Atkinson Kimball (1916–1918)
 Mabel Rollins (1918–1920)
 Charlotte Lewis (1921)
 Ellery Sedgwick (1922)
 Ethel B. Power (1923–1934)
 Arthur H. Samuels (1934–1936)
 Kenneth K. Stowell (1936–1941)
 Elizabeth Gordon (1941–1964)
 Sarah Tomerlin Lee (1965–1969)
 Wallace Guenther (1969–1977)
 Doris Shaw (1977–1978)
 JoAnn Barwick (1978–1991)
 Louis Oliver Gropp (1991–2000)
 Marian McEvoy (2000–2002)
 Mark Mayfield (2002–2005)
 Stephen Drucker (2005–2010)
 Newell Turner (2010–2015)
 Sophie Donelson (2015–2018)
Joanna Saltz (2018–present)

References

External links 
  (US)
  (UK)
 House Beautiful (US) at the HathiTrust
 Voices of Oklahoma interview with Charles Faudree. First person interview conducted on October 8, 2012, with Charles Faudree, interior designer featured in House Beautiful. 
 Thoughts of Home: Reflections on Families, Houses, and Homelands from the Pages of House Beautiful Magazine

Women's magazines published in the United States
Lifestyle magazines published in the United States
Monthly magazines published in the United States
Magazines established in 1896
Hearst Communications publications
Magazines published in New York City
Design magazines